Vijanones (or Vejanoness) was a former non-salute princely state in Gujarat, western India.

History 
Vijanones was a petty princely state, in the Gohelwar prant of Kathiawar, comprising only the village.

It had a population of 193 in 1901, yielding a state revenue of 750 Rupees (1903-4, nearly all from land) and a paying a tribute of 31 Rupees, to the Gaekwar Baroda State.

References 

Princely states of Gujarat